Love Field may refer to:

Love Field (film), a 1992 American film
Love Field, Dallas, a neighborhood in Dallas, Texas
"Love Field", a song by Elvis Costelio on the 1984 album  Goodbye Cruel World
Dallas Love Field, an airport in Texas, United States
 Love Field (DART station), a proposed rapid-transit rail station
Ernest A. Love Field, an airport in Arizona, United States